= Villa de Pomán =

Coordinates: 28°23′S 66°13′W

- Municipality and town
- Interactive map of Villa de Pomán
- Country: Argentina
- Province: Catamarca Province

Area
  - Total: 0.166 sq mi (0.431 km^{2})

Population (2015)
  - Total: 925
  - Density: 5,560/sq mi (2,150/km^{2})
- Time zone: UTC−3 (ART)

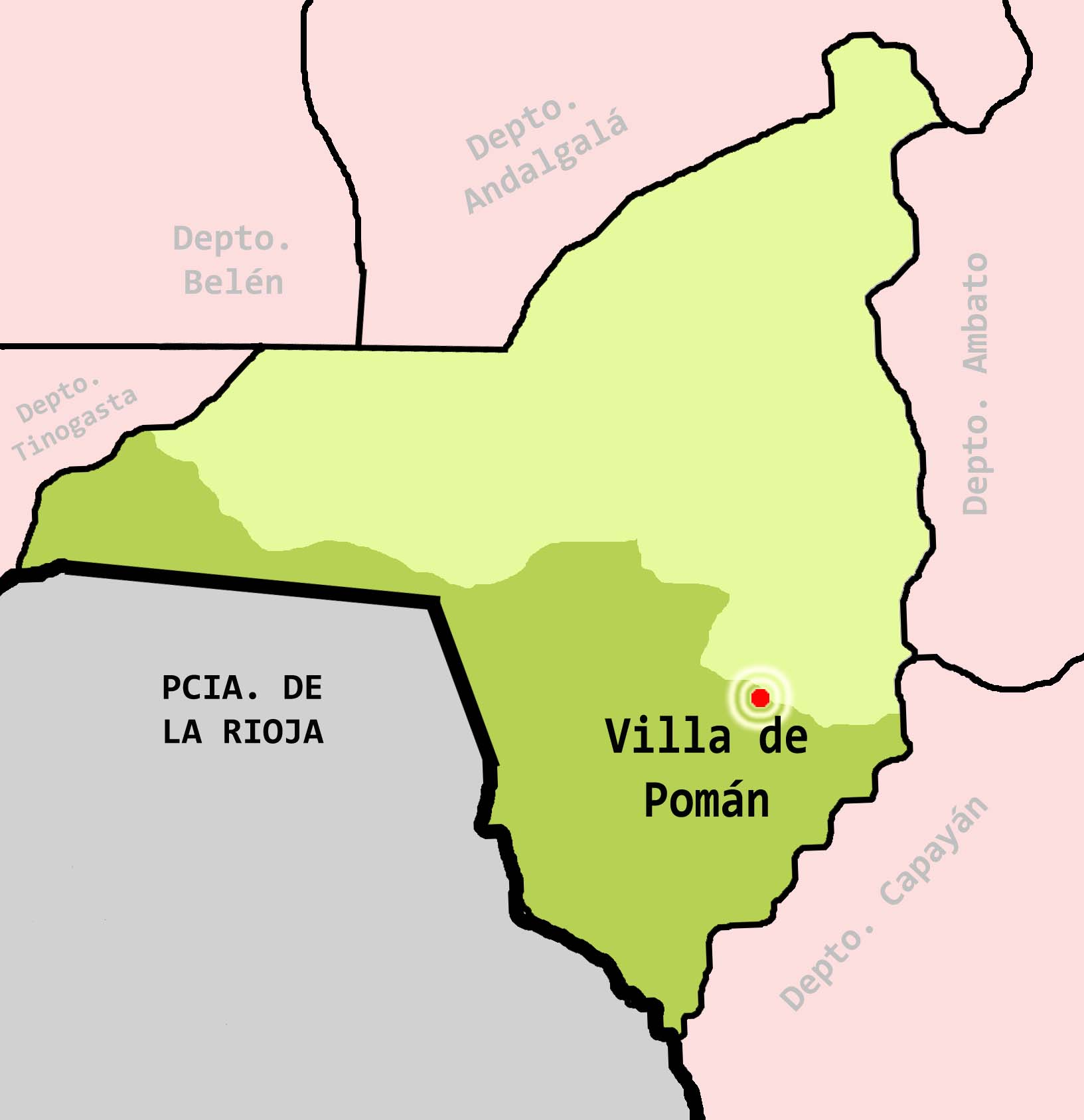

Villa de Pomán is a town and municipality in Catamarca Province in northwestern Argentina.

It has 2,259 inhabitants (INDEC, 2001), representing an increase of 43.24% compared with 1,577 inhabitants (INDEC, 1991) the previous census.
